Uli Vos (2 September 1946 – 1 December 2017) was a German field hockey player.
 At the 1972 Munich Olympics, Vos was a member of the gold-medal winning West German field hockey team.
He also played at club level for Gladbacher HTC.

References

External links
 

1946 births
2017 deaths
German male field hockey players
Olympic field hockey players of West Germany
Field hockey players at the 1968 Summer Olympics
Field hockey players at the 1972 Summer Olympics
Field hockey players at the 1976 Summer Olympics
Medalists at the 1972 Summer Olympics
Olympic gold medalists for West Germany
Olympic medalists in field hockey
Sportspeople from Mönchengladbach
20th-century German people